Yaddanapudi Sulochana Rani (2 April 1940 – 18 May 2018) was an Indian Telugu language novelist. She had a strong fan following since the 1970s and early 1980s, especially among women. Several of her stories were made into films and television serials. She won two Nandi Awards.

Early life and career
Yaddanapudi Sulochana Rani was born on 2 April 1940 in a Telugu Niyogi Brahmin family at Kaza in Krishna district, Andhra Pradesh. She used to have strong inclination towards literature from her childhood. She has written over 80 novels.

Death 
Yaddanapudi died on 18 May 2018 in California, U.S. while visiting her daughter. Telangana Chief Minister K. Chandrashekar Rao, and Andhra Pradesh opposition leader Y. S. Jagan Mohan Reddy offered their condolences.

Novels made as films

Other novels 

 Keerti Kireetaalu
 Aagamana
 Aradhana
 Aatmiyulu
 Abhijata
 Abhisapam
 Aahuti
 Amara Hridayam
 Amrita Dhara
 Anandha Sametha
 Anuraga Ganga
 Anuraga Toranam
 Artha Sthita
 Ashala Shikharaalu
 Avyaktam
 Bahumati
 Bandee
 Cheekatilo Chiru Deepam
 Dampatya Vanam
 Ee Desham Maakemichchindhi
 Ee Jeevitam Naadi
 Ee Taram Katha
 Girija Kalyanam
 Hridaya Ganam
 Jahnavi
 Jalapatam
 Jeevana Geetam
 Jeevana Tarangalu-1
 Jeevana Tarangalu-2
 Jeevana Satyalu
 Jeevana Sourabham
 Jyoti
 Kalala Kougili
 Krishna Lohita
 Madhura Swapnam
 Meena ( Adapted into A Aa)
 Meena 2 (Adapted into A Aa)
 Mohita
 Manobhirama 
 Maduramina Otami
 Mouna Bhashyam
 Mouna Poratam
 Nama Chandrikalu
 Neerajanam
 Nenu Rachayitrini Kaanu
 Nishanta
 Ontari Nakshatram 1
 Ontari Nakshatram 2
 Parthu
 Prema Deepika
 Prema Peetham
 Prema Simhasanam
 Priya Sakhi
 Sahajeevanam
 Samsara Ratham
 Samyukta
 Sitapati
 Snehamayi
 Sougandhi
 Shweta Gulabi
 Sravana Sameeralu
 Vennello Mallika
 Vijetha
 Vemalu

Awards
Nandi Awards
 Best Story Writer - Aatma Gowravam (1965)
 Second Best Story Writer - Kanchana Ganga (1984)

References

1940 births
2018 deaths
Indian women novelists
People from Krishna district
Novelists from Andhra Pradesh
Telugu-language writers
Telugu women writers
Telugu writers
20th-century Indian women writers
20th-century Indian novelists
Women writers from Andhra Pradesh